Department of Fish and Game may refer to:

Alaska Department of Fish and Game
California Department of Fish and Wildlife (formerly California Department of Fish and Game)
New Mexico Department of Game and Fish
Idaho Department of Fish and Game